Joseph E. "Joe" Sinnott (born c. 1966) was the 47th mayor of Erie, Pennsylvania. A Democrat, he served three terms from January 2, 2006, to January 2, 2018. He was succeeded by Joseph Schember.

Biography
A lifelong resident of Erie, Sinnott graduated from Academy High School in 1984, and Gannon University in 1988 with a B.S. in chemistry. He worked as a chemist at the Erie Waste Water Treatment Plant for eight years, then was accepted to Case Western Reserve University School of Law in 1996 and graduated in 1999. He joined the firm of Quinn, Buseck, Leemhuis, Toohey & Kroto in Erie, concentrating on environmental and commercial law and later practiced municipal and family law with Erie's Carney & Good for several years.

In 2003, Sinnott was elected to the city council for a four-year term. In 2005, he successfully ran for mayor of Erie, taking office on January 2, 2006. He was reelected in 2009 and again in 2013.

Sinnot's parents, Edward and Gloria, were public school teachers.

See also
List of mayors of Erie, Pennsylvania

References

External links
Mayor's Biography www.erie.pa.us

1960s births
Living people
Mayors of Erie, Pennsylvania
Pennsylvania Democrats
Pennsylvania lawyers
21st-century American chemists
Gannon University alumni
Case Western Reserve University School of Law alumni
21st-century American politicians